Gaafaru (Dhivehi: ގާފަރު) is one of the inhabited islands of Kaafu Atoll, the only island of the natural atoll known as Gaafaru.

Geography

Gahaafaru Atoll
Gahaafaru or Gaafaru (Northern Reef) is a large elliptical reef with only a small inhabited island at its eastern end. This reef has proved disastrous to many vessels. Gaafaru reef is as much a separate atoll as Goifulhafehendhu Atoll or Rasdhukuramathi Atoll which are similar in structure and size. It is separated from Kagi (the northernmost island of North Malé Atoll) by a narrow but deep channel - the Gaafaru Kandu. Its lagoon has an average depth of 16 fathoms (30 m) and has no coral patches or shoals in its centre. Gaafaru is a small island surrounded by a big reef.

Demography

References

 Divehi Tārīkhah Au Alikameh. Divehi Bahāi Tārikhah Khidmaiykurā l Markazu. Reprint 1958 edn. Malé 1990. 
 Divehiraajjege Jōgrafīge Vanavaru. Muhammadu Ibrahim Lutfee. G.Sōsanī.
 Xavier Romero-Frias, The Maldive Islanders, A Study of the Popular Culture of an Ancient Ocean Kingdom. Barcelona 1999.l

Islands of the Maldives